Dongsheng is a town in Yingshan County in northeastern Sichuan province, China, located around  east of the county seat. , it has 20 villages under its administration.

See also 
 List of township-level divisions of Sichuan

References 

Towns in Sichuan
Nanchong